Nanning No.2 High School (abbreviated NNEZ; Chinese: 南宁市第二中学)is a senior high school in Nanning, Guangxi, China.  The school was ranked as one of the "Top 100 High Schools of China" in 2017.

With a long history and professional education resources, Nanning No.2 High School students progress to further education. Its alumni are spread around the world. For example, Lai Keji works as an assistant professor at the University of Texas at Austin. The school is bringing professionals from universities in various fields to broaden students' visions through a school program, Yuan Zu Forum.

See also 

 Nanning No.3 High School
 Liuzhou Senior High School

References 

High schools in Guangxi